Tyree Jawan Thomas (born June 2, 1995), known professionally as Bfb Da Packman, is an American rapper. He became known through the single "Free Joe Exotic" with Sada Baby, which reached 10 million views in six weeks.

Early life 
Thomas was born on June 2, 1995, in Flint, Michigan. He lived with his mother, stepfather, and brother in the Selby Hood area. He first started rapping when in the sixth grade. Not long after, he started selling weed to earn extra money. Thomas sold narcotics throughout his teens, eventually catching a case involving both guns and drugs. After this incident he made the choice to stop. In 2015, Thomas moved from Flint to Houston, Texas after being released from probation for the gun and drug charges. In Houston, he found a job at the United States Postal Service while continuing to rap in his free time.

Career 
In 2019, he released the projects God Blessing All the Fat Niggas and STD.

On June 14, 2020, Thomas released the single "Free Joe Exotic"  alongside fellow Michigan rapper Sada Baby, which became his breakout hit. The song was inspired and named after Joe Exotic, the subject of Tiger King released from March 20 to April 12, 2020. According to Thomas, he had to get a "guest-feature discount" to include Sada Baby in the song. In September 2020, he said on Twitter that making music helped pay off his grandmother's debt. On September 26, 2020, he released the single "Fun Time" with Wiz Khalifa. On December 11, 2020, he was featured on a remix of "Alpha" by Guapdad 4000. The music video was supported by skits posted onto Twitter, with Guapdad in whiteface as "Permit Patrick."

On March 19, 2021, he released the single "Federal" alongside a music video. On June 22, 2021, Thomas announced his debut album, Fat Niggas Need Love Too, would be released on June 25. The album includes artists such as Benny the Butcher, Coi Leray, Sada Baby, Wiz Khalifa, Lil Yachty, Zack Fox, and DDG. As well as the album, he released the single "Weekend at Solomon's" along with a music video. In an interview with Vice about the album, Thomas hoped that the album could bring him closer to leaving the USPS.

Discography

Studio albums

Projects

Singles

References 

1995 births
21st-century American rappers
Rappers from Michigan
Living people
African-American male rappers
21st-century African-American musicians
People from Flint, Michigan